Hatting is a municipality in the district Innsbruck-Land and is located 18 km west of the city of Innsbruck. The village was mentioned around 11th century for the first time.

Population

References

External links
Town History (German)

Cities and towns in Innsbruck-Land District